Mattsee is a market town at the eponymous lake in the district of Salzburg-Umgebung in the Austrian state of Salzburg.

History

About 765 Duke Tassilo III of Bavaria established the Mattsee Benedictine Abbey, which became a part of the Diocese of Passau in 993 and was transformed into a college of canons. The Bishops of Passau had the Mattsee Castle built in the 12th century.

Under the jurisdiction of the Archdiocese of Salzburg since 1807, the college still exists today. The abbey church, a Gothic building, has a rich Baroque equipment and a prominent 60m/197 ft high steeple added in 1766. Adjacent is a museum showing paintings of Johann Michael Rottmayr, an astronomical clock and an 860 grant deed by King Louis the German.

Notable people
Anton Diabelli, composer, born in Mattsee on September 6, 1781, died on April 8, 1858 in Vienna
Dorothea Seyss-Inquart, daughter of Arthur Seyss-Inquart (born 7 May 1928, still alive , living in Mattsee, Upper Austria ).

Twin town
 Bühl (Germany, since 1972)

References

Cities and towns in Salzburg-Umgebung District